Jhoomra is a tala of Hindustani music. Jhoomra tala has 14 beats. Jhoomra is often used in the vilambit or ati-vilambit (slow) Khyal.

Arrangement
Jhoomra tala can be counted like this:
clap, 2, 3, clap, 2, 3, 4, wave, 2, 3, clap, 2, 3, 4
Or can be counted like this:
clap, 2, 3, clap, 5, 6, 7 wave, 9, 10, clap, 12, 13, 14

Theka
This is arrangement of Jhoomra:
Dhin | -Dha | TiRiKaTa
Dhin | Dhin | Dha Ge | TiRiKaTa
Tin | -Ta | TiRiKaTa
Dhin | Dhin | Dha Ge | TiRiKaTa
Theka of Jhoomra can be arranged like this:

References

Hindustani talas